Kaan Urgancıoğlu (born 8 May 1981) is a Turkish actor.

Life and career

Kaan Urgancioglu was born on 8 May 1981 in İzmir, Turkey. On his father's side he is of Turkish descent and on his mother's side he is of Albanian and Syrian descent. He went to school at the Private Turkish College Secondary School and the American College. After graduating from highschool, he moved to Istanbul in 2000 and studied at the Marmara University's Finance Department. Kaan Urgancıoğlu started to study cinema as well as university education. He graduated after 7 years. In 2002, while still at university, he started to work as an actor on the recommendation of actress Demet Akbağ, a family friend. 

Urgancıoğlu had his first role as the lead actor in a series based on the historical comic book Karaoğlan. He then had a role in the youth series Kampüsistan. He played in many popular series and films afterwards. In 2008 he went to the United States and studied acting there for 6 months. He is best known for playing Emir Kozcuoğlu in Kara Sevda, one of the most successful Turkish series internationally and the only Turkish series in history to win the International Emmy Award for "Best Telenovela", along with two other international awards. He also starred in the Netflix original series Aşk 101, which premiered in 2020. In 2021, he began starring in Yargı and shared the leading roles with Pınar Deniz, with whom he had previously co-starred in Aşk 101.

Filmography

Awards and nominations

References 

21st-century Turkish male actors
1981 births
Living people
Turkish male television actors
Turkish male film actors
Turkish people of Albanian descent
Turkish people of Syrian descent
Actors from İzmir